Diofanny Jane Paguia-Zamora (born January 3, 1983, in Manila, Philippines), known professionally as Jopay is a Filipina singer, dancer and actress. She is a former Senior Member and original member of Sexbomb Singers, with Rochelle Pangilinan, Evette Pabalan, Weng Ibarra, Izzy Trazona-Aragon and Monic Icban of the SexBomb Girls. Jopáy is also a cousin of singer-actress Nadine Lustre. A song entitled "Jopay" (composed and sang by Mayonnaise) was written about her. She is married to Joshua Zamora, a former and original member of the dance troupe Maneuvers.

Discography

Albums
(with the SexBomb Girls)
2002: Unang Putok (4× Platinum)
2003: Round 2 (5× Platinum)
2004: Bomb Thr3at (2× Platinum)
2005: Sumayaw, Sumunod: The Best of the Sexbomb Girls (Platinum)
2006: Daisy Siete: V-DAY

Compilation albums
(billed with the SexBomb Dancers)
2002: Sexbomb's Sexiest Hits (Gold)

Filmography

Television

Films
2002: Bakit Papa
2002: Lastikman
2007: Fantastic Man (together with Grace, Rochelle, Jacky, Cynthia)

In popular culture
 Fino Herrera portrayed Jopay, a gay version of Jepoy in the latest episode of Oh My Dad!

References

External links

Biography on GMA celebrities
Official Website of the SexBomb Girls

1983 births
Living people
Actresses from Manila
21st-century Filipino actresses
Filipino dance musicians
Filipino female dancers
SexBomb Girls members
GMA Network personalities
ABS-CBN personalities